The Cantonal Council of Solothurn is the legislature of the canton of Solothurn, in Switzerland.  Solothurn has a unicameral legislature.  The Cantonal Council has 100 seats, with members elected every four years.

In the last election, on 7 March 2009, saw the centre-right maintain its dominance of the Cantonal Council.  FDP.The Liberals lost three seats, but remained the largest party, with 27 seats.  The Christian Democrats added two seats, becoming the second-largest party, on 24 seats.  The Social Democrats lost ground, falling three seats to 21 overall, whilst the Swiss People's Party gained one seat to 18.  The left-wing Green Party and centre-right Green Liberal Party also gained two seats apiece.

|-
! style="background-color:#E9E9E9;text-align:left;" colspan=2 |Party
! style="background-color:#E9E9E9;text-align:left;" width=150px |Ideology
! style="background-color:#E9E9E9;text-align:right;" width=50px |Vote %
! style="background-color:#E9E9E9;text-align:right;" width=50px |Vote % ±
! style="background-color:#E9E9E9;text-align:right;" width=50px |Seats
! style="background-color:#E9E9E9;text-align:right;" width=50px |Seats ±
|-
| style="background-color: " |
| style="text-align:left;" | FDP.The Liberals
| style="text-align:left;" | Classical liberalism
| style="text-align:right;" | 22.7
| style="text-align:right;" | –1.9
| style="text-align:right;" | 22
| style="text-align:right;" | –4
|-
| width=5px style="background-color: " |
| style="text-align:left;" | Swiss People's Party
| style="text-align:left;" | National conservatism
| style="text-align:right;" | 21.0
| style="text-align:right;" | +1.3
| style="text-align:right;" | 21
| style="text-align:right;" | +3
|-
| style="background-color: " |
| style="text-align:left;" | Social Democratic Party
| style="text-align:left;" | Social democracy
| style="text-align:right;" | 19.3
| style="text-align:right;" | –2.3
| style="text-align:right;" | 20
| style="text-align:right;" | –3
|-
| style="background-color: " |
| style="text-align:left;" | Christian Democratic People's Party
| style="text-align:left;" | Christian democracy
| style="text-align:right;" | 17.6
| style="text-align:right;" | –1.3
| style="text-align:right;" | 20
| style="text-align:right;" | ±0
|-
| style="background-color: " |
| style="text-align:left;" | Green Party
| style="text-align:left;" | Green politics
| style="text-align:right;" | 10.3
| style="text-align:right;" | +2.8
| style="text-align:right;" | 10
| style="text-align:right;" | +3
|-
| style="background-color: " |
| style="text-align:left;" | Green Liberal Party
| style="text-align:left;" | Green liberalism
| style="text-align:right;" | 7.0
| style="text-align:right;" | +2.8
| style="text-align:right;" | 6
| style="text-align:right;" | +3
|- 
| style="background-color: " |
| style="text-align:left;" | Evangelical People's Party
| style="text-align:left;" | Christian democracy
| style="text-align:right;" | 1.9
| style="text-align:right;" | +0.8
| style="text-align:right;" | 1
| style="text-align:right;" | ±0
|- 
| style="background-color: " |
| style="text-align:left;" | Swiss Democrats
| style="text-align:left;" | Swiss nationalism
| style="text-align:right;" | 0.2
| style="text-align:right;" | N/A
| style="text-align:right;" | 0
| style="text-align:right;" | N/A
|- style="background: #E9E9E9"
! style="text-align:left;" colspan=3| Total
| style="text-align:right;" |  100.00
| style="text-align:right;" |  –
| 100
| style="text-align:right;" | –
|-
| colspan=8 style="text-align:left;" | Source: Canton of Solothurn
|}

External links
  Cantonal Council of Solothurn official website

Solothurn
Politics of the canton of Solothurn
Solothurn